Binde may refer to:

People
Juris Binde (born 1955), a Latvian businessman and president of Latvijas Mobilais Telefons

Places
Binde, Germany, a village in Altmarkkreis Salzwedel district in the state of Saxony-Anhalt, Germany
Binde, Norway, a village in Steinkjer municipality in Trøndelag county, Norway
Binde Department, a department in Zoundwéogo Province, Burkina Faso
Binde, Burkina Faso, a village in Binde Department in Zoundwéogo Province, Burkina Faso

See also
Bindi (disambiguation)